The New York House of Refuge was the first juvenile reformatory established in the United States. The reformatory was opened in 1824 on the Bowery in Manhattan, New York City, destroyed by a fire in 1839, and relocated first to Twenty-Third Street and then, in 1854, to Randalls Island.

Through its 111-year history the reformatory was privately funded, receiving only guidance, supervision and additional funding from state agencies.

Beginning in 1901 female inmates were removed to the newly opened New York State Reformatory for Women, now the Taconic Correctional Facility.  In the 1930s, younger male inmates (ages 12 to 15) were transferred to the new state training school at Warwick, and the older boys to the newly constructed state prison in Coxsackie. The House of Refuge closed on May 11, 1935.

References

External links
New York Public Library Digital Gallery

Juvenile detention centers in the United States
Buildings and structures in Manhattan
1825 establishments in New York (state)
Randalls and Wards Islands
Bowery
23rd Street (Manhattan)
1935 disestablishments in New York (state)